Tihomir Doder (born 8 August 1979) is a Serbian handball player for Serbian club in third league Gajdobra

Career
Doder started out at Jugović and helped the club win the EHF Challenge Cup in the 2000–01 season. He later moved abroad to Tunisia. Between 2005 and 2012, Doder played for Cangas and Vardar, spending two periods with each club.

Doder represented FR Yugoslavia at the 2002 European Men's Handball Championship.

References

External links
 EHF record

1979 births
Living people
Sportspeople from Novi Sad
Serbian male handball players
RK Jugović players
RK Vardar players
Liga ASOBAL players